Joseph Reed (c. 1823–1890), a Cornishman by birth, was a prolific and influential Victorian era architect in Melbourne, Australia.  He established his practice in 1853, which through various partnerships and name changes, continues today as Bates Smart, one of the oldest firms continually operating in Australia.

Biography
Born in 1823 in Cornwall, England, Joseph Reed's early career may have included some local training, and he is known to have worked in the offices of some noted architects in London. He decided to start a new career at the age of 30 in Australia, arriving in Melbourne in 1853, and very soon made a name for himself. The next year he won the design competition for the State Library of Victoria, the Geelong City Hall in 1855, and designed the Bank of New South Wales in Collins Street in 1856.

In 1859, botanist F.Muell. published Reedia, a genus of flowering plants from south-western Australia, belonging to the family Cyperaceae and was named in Joseph Reed's honour.

In 1862 he partnered with Frederick Barnes (1824-1884).

In 1883 Barnes retired from the partnership and Reed was joined by A. M. Henderson and F. J. Smart. In 1890 Henderson withdrew while N. B. Tappin joined the firm, and Reed himself died. The office later became Bates, Peebles & Smart.

Later in life, Reed met and married Hannah Elliot Lane on the 26 March 1885. They had no children.

In the late 1880s Reed had come into financial difficulties through land speculation, which is said to have affected his health such that he died of "inanition and exhaustion" on 29 April 1890.

Architectural expression
Reed's buildings represent an impressive body of work, in a range of then popular styles, each one a fine essay in the chosen idiom. He could design in Neoclassical, Renaissance Revival, Gothic Revival, Italianate, Baroque, French Second Empire, Romanesque and Queen Anne, and of course as typical for 19th century architects, designs that blended more than one historical style.

Following a visit to Europe in 1863 he experienced first hand the late medieval brick architecture of Lombardy, the source for the bold polychrome brick Gothic Revival already popular in England, which he soon expressed in his designs for the Independent Church on Collins Street, St Jude's in Carlton, and Frederick T. Sargood's Rippon Lea Estate at Elsternwick. These works were the first expression of polychrome brick medieval Italian in Victoria, which by the 1880s had gained enormous popularity.

Major works include the classical State Library of Victoria (1856), Collins Street Independent Church (1867), Frederick Sargood's Rippon Lea Estate (1868) and Melbourne Trades Hall (1873). In contrast to the polychrome Romanesque of Rippon Lea and the Independent Church is the stern Gothic manner of Scots' Church (1871-4) across the road; the energetic spire was for the last decades of the nineteenth century Melbourne's tallest structure. The Trades Hall is grandly palatial, the world's oldest and probably most splendid trades hall. In the fashionable Second Empire style Reed also designed Melbourne Town Hall (1870) while the World Heritage-listed Royal Exhibition Building, completed for the 1880 International Exposition in Melbourne is Italianate with a Florentine dome. Reed completed the building of St Paul's Anglican Cathedral to the designs of William Butterfield after that architect resigned the project in 1884. Reed was faithful to the original design, but provided most of the furnishings, including the elaborate pulpit, and the attached Chapter House in matching style.

List of works
 State Library of Victoria (designed 1854, built in many stages)
 Collins Street Baptist Church (1854)
 Geelong City Hall (1855)
 Bank of New South Wales, Collins St (1856) (facade relocated to Melbourne University 1935)
 Wesley Church (1857)
 182-186 George Street, East Melbourne (1857)
 Royal Society Buildings (1858) 
 157 Hotham Street, East Melbourne (1861) (attributed) 
 Commercial Banking Company of Sydney (1862), demolished 1956
 Beleura House (designed for James Butchart in 1863) - Mornington
 Independent Church (1866)
 The Menzies Hotel (1867), demolished 1970
 Rippon Lea Estate (1868) 
 Melbourne Town Hall (1869)
 Carlton Methodist Mission, now Church of All Nations, Palmerston St, Carlton (1870)
 Melbourne Trades Hall (1873) 
 Scots' Church (1873) 
 Bank of Australasia (later ANZ), Collins Street (1876) 
 Faraday Street School, Carlton (1876) 
 Academy of Music, Bourke St East (1876). Renamed Bijou Theatre 1880. Burnt down 1889.
 Eildon Mansion, St Kilda (1877) 
 Eastern Market (1877) (Reed & Barnes) (demolished c1960)
 Wilson Hall, Melbourne University (destroyed by fire in 1952)
 Royal Exhibition Building (1879) 
 Ormond College, Melbourne University (1881)
 Holy Trinity Church, East St Kilda (1882–1889) 
 Old Pathology Building, Melbourne University (1885) 
 Sacred Heart Church, St Kilda (1884) 
 Appointed supervising architect to St Paul's Cathedral, Melbourne (1884-1890)
 Lombard Building (15-17 Queen Street) (1887) 
 Baldwin Spencer Building, Melbourne University (1887) 
 Old Physics Conference Room and Gallery, Melbourne University (1888) 
 Chapter House, St Paul's Cathedral, Melbourne (1889)
 Redcourt Estate (Armadale) (1888)

Gallery

References

External links
 

1823 births
1890 deaths
Architects from Melbourne
Year of birth uncertain
Australian people of Cornish descent
British emigrants to colonial Australia